Gallery 16 is a contemporary art gallery located in the SoMa district of San Francisco, California. It is owned by the San Francisco-based painter Griff Williams, and opened in 1993. Artists who have exhibited there include Graham Gillmore, Tucker Nichols, Rex Ray, Alex Zecca, Shaun O'Dell, Josh Jefferson, Thomas Heinser, Libby Black, Margaret Kilgallen, Arturo Herrera, Michelle Grabner, and Mark Grotjahn. In 2010 it hosted an exhibition on Emigre magazine.

Gallery 16 Editions
Gallery 16 Editions is the gallery's publishing program. It utilizes contemporary printmaking methods to create portfolios and artist books. Its publications have included Barry Gifford's Las Quatro Reinas, Prince Andrew Romanoff's The Boy Who Would Be Tsar, James F. Miles' Is a Boyfriend And A Girlfriend with Harrell Fletcher, and Colter Jacobsen's Good Times: Bad Trips with Scott Hewicker and Cliff Hengst.

References

External links
 Gallery 16 - official site

Art museums and galleries in San Francisco